Francisca Wilhelmina "Cisca" Dresselhuys (born 21 April 1943 in Leeuwarden) was the first head editor of the Dutch feminist monthly magazine Opzij from 1 November 1981 until 1 April 2008. Her journalistic career started at the daily Trouw.

On 11 June 2001, she received the Anne Vondeling prize for her publications in the year 2000.  For the award she received 5000 guilders and a sculpture of Anne Vondeling.

As a republican, Dresselhuys opined that the abdication of Beatrix in 2013 should have been seized to abolish the Dutch monarchy. Although she was quite content with Máxima's efforts for the emancipation of women thus far, it was unjust how her position as the king's wife was subordinate, despite her misleading style of 'Queen'. In case of a new female head of state, Dresselhuys preferred a president heading a republic 'who has to deserve it, has to fight, take responsibility.'

Work 
Drukker dan ooit. Werken na je 65ste (2011). Just Publishers.

References 

1943 births
Living people
Feminist writers
Dutch republicans
Dutch journalists
Dutch investigative journalists
People from Leeuwarden
Dutch feminists